Kobina Amua-Sekyi was a Ghanaian politician and was a member of the first parliament of the second Republic of Ghana. He represented the Ekumfi constituency under the membership of the Progress Party (PP). He is the father of Supreme Court Justice Kweku Etrew Amua-Sekyi.

Early life and education 
Kobina was born on 6 May 1902. He attended Methodist School Saltpond. Where he obtained his Standard Seven, Civil Service Examination and later worked as a Merchant and a Traditional ruler before going into Parliament.

Personal life 
He was a Christian.

Politics 
He began his political career in 1969 when he became the parliamentary candidate for the Progress Party (PP) to represent his constituency in the Central Region of Ghana prior to the commencement of the 1969 Ghanaian parliamentary election.

He was sworn into the First Parliament of the Second Republic of Ghana on 1 October 1969, after being pronounced winner at the 1969 Ghanaian election held on 26 August 1969.

References 

1902 births
Year of death missing
Ghanaian MPs 1969–1972
Progress Party (Ghana) politicians